Hervey Ely House, also known as the Daughters of the American Revolution Chapter House, is a historic home located at Rochester in Monroe County, New York.

It was built about 1837 in the Greek Revival style.  It is a 2½ story brick structure covered in stucco.

The house has been owned since 1920 by the Irondequoit chapter of the Daughters of the American Revolution.

It is located within the boundaries of the Third Ward Historic District. It was listed on the National Register of Historic Places in 1971.

History

Third Ward Historic District Rochester, New York 
The Hervey Ely House is located on Troupe Street in the Third Ward Historic District of Rochester, New York. The house immensely impacted the architecture emerging around it, with Greek Revival styles becoming prevalent and popular during the early 19th Century period. 

The Third Ward was formerly called the “Ruffled Shirt Ward”, and is currently referred to as “Corn Hill”.  Housing issues arose from Rochester’s founding in 1817 because the city grew at exponential rates. Many workers arrived in Rochester in a rush, leading to housing shortages. The city temporarily combatted the shortages through building houses outward from the center of the city.  The Third Ward became a thriving social site due to wealthy house owners hosting parties and galas, and the emergence of clubs. In addition, The Female Charitable Society was founded in 1820, becoming a social gathering and service opportunity for the women in the Ward. Many private schools were established because education was highly valued, as well.  

A major section of the influx of workers were non-native to the United States and unable to speak English, many being Eastern Jews, Italians, Greeks, and Ukrainians. Householders in Rochester were unwilling to rent to those with other languages and ethnic backgrounds and rent prices increased due to the rise in population, beginning the appearance of slum-like settlements where non-native citizens resided in warehouses in the Seventh Ward. To confront the housing problem, the Third Ward Renewal Plan and public housing projects were introduced in the early 1900’s. Small cottages and houses were assembled and put at moderate prices and old architecture was preserved. However, this plan pushed out African American families who resided in their homes and it led to riots breaking out in the Third and Seventh Wards even after the plans were completed.

Hervey Ely 
Hervey Ely was the owner of many renowned gristmills, most notably the Red Mills, and original owner of the Hervey Ely House.  He was 22 years old when he moved to Rochester in 1813 and started a sawmill on the Genesee River.  After success with the sawmill, he transitioned into flour milling, erecting mills across the Erie Canal. He utilized the canal as an artery for grain and flour shipments and became the first to ship grain through the canal in 1828.  The mills accumulated a great wealth for Ely and he and his wife, Caroline, bought a custom mansion in 1837 by the architect, Hugh Hastings.  The house was renowned for its Greek Revival style, located by Livingston Park in Monroe County, New York. 

In 1842, flour prices dropped, sending Ely on the verge of bankruptcy. He sold his house, which was then occupied by Reverend Henry John Whithouse. Following Whitehouse, William Kidd, Azariah Boody, and Howard Osgood inhabited the mansion until it was acquired by the Daughters of the American Revolution in 1920. It has since stayed in their care.

Hugh Hastings 
Hugh Hastings, or S. P. Hastings, was the architect for the Hervey Ely House and the Jonathan Child house in the Third Ward Historic District. Hastings was known for his Greek Revival architecture. Construction for the Hervey Ely House ended in 1837 and he began construction on a project for Jonathan Child, the first mayor of Rochester and son-in-law to Colonel Nathaniel Rochester. The Jonathan Child House was completed between 1837 and 1838 with a similar Greek Revival style to the Hervey Ely House.

Daughters of the American Revolution 
The Hervey Ely House was adopted by the organization the Daughters of the American Revolution. The DAR is a woman led association that was created in the 1890s with the intention of promoting “national census” and citizenship.  Among their conservative views of preserving the state of their country, the organization also focused on the preservation of historical artifacts. That is the purpose of the Hervey Ely House, a museum and a safe home to important documents and influential objects. One example of such an object is a drum from a sixteen-year-old drummer who worked on Washington’s Life Guard for about four years.

The Daughters of the American Revolution have had many important figures enrolled in their society, such as Susan B. Anthony, Alice Paul, Julia Ward Howe, Harriet Taylor Upton, etc.  This is a woman created and woman directed establishment that still operates today. 

Founded in the 1890s and many years later, the organization was under suspicion for controversial topics. The group was thought of supporting anti-immigration policies and being discriminative towards minority groups. At the birth of the group, many of the members were white women. Another controversy surrounding the Daughters of the American Revolution was that they supported white supremacy. This was based on the fact of the artifacts they collected within their museums.  Like many things, the organization evolved with the times and the integration of people of color into white establishments. The Daughters of the American Revolution have a more diverse look today, with many members being women of minority groups. In 1977, the first Black member, Michelle Wherry, was accepted in the society and has since then grown the organization to the accepting group it is today. 

The Daughters of the American Revolution are still working today to preserve the history of the United States through the maintenance and sustaining of important pieces of the past.

Architecture Style 
The Hervey Ely House is constructed in the Greek Revival Style. This type of architecture was popular in the early 19th century, primarily in the Northeast, more specifically, New York.  This famous style is modeled after many of the popular Greek buildings like the Parthenon, Odeon of Herodes Atticus, and temples like Apollo, Artemis, Hera, Hephaestus, etc.. It is also considered America’s first architectural style because it was popular during the early birth of the United States of America and the growth of citizenship. Some famous buildings that also utilize this notorious style are most early 1800s state capitals and governmental buildings.

This style has a very recognizable and discernible feature which is its large columns, pediments, porticoes, and wide friezes. Columns could be separated into many subsets, such as Doric, Ionic, Corinthian, Tuscan, and Composite. All of these types have unmistakable characteristics. Pediments are constructed triangular shaped features that are placed at the front of the structure. It allows for the Greek style to be easily identified. Porticos are large platforms that are constructed at the beginning of the building that usually consist of stairs leading to the entryway. Lastly, wide friezes are the final touches on the beautiful construction. Architecture is like an awe-inspiring piece of art. It takes many years and lots of creative minds to construct perfectly. The Greek Revival Style may not possess all of these qualities, it is however modeled after these characteristics. For example, the Hervey Ely House accommodates the Doric style columns.  

The design came to be with architects like Benjamin Henry Latrobe, William Strickland, and Hervey Ely House’s very own Hugh Hastings. Hervey Ely House was designed with twelve foot ceilings, 6,597 square feet of open space, circular shaped staircase, marble fireplaces, and many more elegant characteristics. Without these artists, The United States would not have those amazing historical buildings such as the U.S. Capitol and the Second Bank of the United States in Philadelphia. 

With the influx of immigration and citizenship, more buildings were being constructed, so the architectural design evolved with the times. Although the Greek Revival Style is not utilized as much now as it was in the past, it will always hold a special place in the historical remembrance of early America.

Impact
The Hervey Ely House has been a sufficient part of American and New York history since its construction in 1837. From the beginning, with the architectural style of the Greek Revival by Hugh Hastings, the building has stood as an American dream. First intended to be just a large mansion, the house was then adopted and then altered to serve as a museum for historical artifacts and documents by the Daughters of the American Revolution association. This alteration still stands today and has not been changed since 1920. 

The Hervey Ely House is still open and available for tours. The Daughters of the American Revolution still own the house and many other properties around the famous location, and they allow tourists and historians to view and partake in the enriched history located within Rochester, New York. Other locations within this tour are the Shaw House/Schoeniger Home, Immaculate Conception Church, Fenner House/Cornhill Bell Home, and many more significant sites. 

What the Hervey Ely House and many other museums stand for is extremely important in future years and generations. The preservation of history and memory must continue in order for generations to come to be educated in the ways of the past. Also, with the increase of technology, the need for in-person museum visits is decreasing, but their importance will never cease. The ability to go and be immersed in the history of the United States and the individuals who allowed for our country to be what it is today will forever be sacred. The Hervey Ely House is one of many historic sites that allows for this experience and it is not only an establishment that stores artifacts of this United country, but the building itself is one of great memories.

References

External links

Images of the Hervey Ely House on New York Heritage

Irondequoit Chapter, Daughters of the American Revolution - official museum site
Hervey Ely House - museum information - National Park Service
Information on Hervey Ely House
Article about a visit to the house - New Society of the Genesee

Houses in Rochester, New York
Museums in Rochester, New York
Historic house museums in New York (state)
Houses completed in 1837
Houses on the National Register of Historic Places in New York (state)
Historic American Buildings Survey in New York (state)
Greek Revival houses in New York (state)
Daughters of the American Revolution museums
National Register of Historic Places in Rochester, New York